The year 1999 is the 3rd year in the history of the Pride Fighting Championships, a mixed martial arts promotion based in Japan. 1999 had 4 events beginning with, Pride 5.

Debut Pride FC fighters

The following fighters fought their first Pride FC fight in 1999:

 Anthony Macias
 Bob Schrijber
 Carl Ognibene
 Carlos Barreto
 Ebenezer Fontes Braga
 Egan Inoue
 Enson Inoue
 Fabiano Iha

 Francisco Bueno
 Frank Trigg
 Guy Mezger
 Hiroki Kurosawa
 Larry Parker
 Mark Coleman
 Maurice Smith
 Minoru Toyonaga

 Naoya Ogawa
 Nobuaki Kakuda
 Ricardo Morais
 Soichi Nishida
 Tom Erikson
 Tully Kulihaapai
 Vitor Belfort
 Wanderlei Silva

Events list

Pride 5

Pride 5 was an event held on April 29, 1999, at The Nagoya Rainbow Hall in Nagoya, Japan.

Results

Pride 6

Pride 6 was an event held on July 4, 1999, at The Yokohama Arena in Yokohama, Japan.

Results

Pride 7

Pride 7 was an event held on September 12, 1999, at The Yokohama Arena in Yokohama, Japan.

Results

Pride 8

Pride 8 was an event held on November 21, 1999, at The Ariake Coliseum in Tokyo, Japan.

Results

See also
 Pride Fighting Championships
 List of Pride Fighting Championships champions
 List of Pride Fighting events

References

Pride Fighting Championships events
1999 in mixed martial arts